Briccius Báthory (also Báthori or Bátori, ; died around 1322) was a Hungarian nobleman and the founder of the renowned Báthory family.

Biography
His father was Andrew of Rakoméz, surnamed the Bald, son of Nikolaus, from the Gutkeled clan. Andrew is mentioned in 1250 as a patron of the monastery of Sárvár in the county of Szatmár.

In 1279, Briccius (together with his brothers George (d. 1307) and Benedict (d. 1321) and his uncle Hodos) was rewarded by King Ladislaus IV for military services by granting them Bátor in the county of Szabolcs.

In 1310, Bátor came into the sole possession of Briccius when he reached an agreement with his nephew Michael and his cousin Vid to divide the joint possessions. After this, Briccius and his descendants named themselves "of Bátor" or Báthory.

Briccius fathered five sons from his wife, an unidentified daughter of Marhard Nadabi from the Csák clan:

John I, the first-born son of Briccius, became Count of Szatmár.
Andrew II (d. 1345) became Bishop of Varadinum.
Laurence I died without issue.
Nicolaus I (d. 1357/63) became Count of Csongrád.
Luke (d. 1330), the youngest son, who possessed wide estates in Szatmár and was granted the lordship of Ecsed.

Among these John was the ancestor of the Báthory of Somlyó, the elder branch of the family, while Luke was the ancestor of the Báthory of Ecsed, the younger branch.

Notes

References
Farin, Michael, Heroine des Grauens. Elisabeth Báthory. Munich: P. Kirchheim, 2003. .

Wertner, Moritz, "Urgeschlechter in Siebenbürgen.", in Archiv des Vereins für siebenbürgische Landeskunde. Neue Folge, Bd. 29, Heft 1 (1899), Hermannstadt 1899, pp. 156–235.

Briccius
13th-century Hungarian people
14th-century Hungarian people